Accelerated Learning Solutions is a charter school operator headquartered in Miramar, Florida. The company focuses operations on dropout prevention and credit recovery schools.

As of January 2013, Accelerated Learning Solutions operated 10 schools in Florida. In 2013 the company expanded to Charlotte, North Carolina with the opening of Charlotte Charter High and West Charlotte Charter High.

Randle Richardson is Chief Executive Office of Accelerated Learning Solutions, which focuses on potential high school drop-outs. Phil McNally is Chairman.

Schools
The company's schools include:

Florida
 Flagler High School in Pompano Beach, Florida
 North Nicholas High School in Cape Coral, Florida, an alternative school for students at risk of dropping out.

North Carolina
Charlotte Charter High in Charlotte, North Carolina, a dropout prevention and credit recovery school
West Charlotte Charter High in Charlotte, North Carolina a dropout prevention and credit recovery school
Central Wake High School in Raleigh, North Carolina, a dropout prevention and credit recovery school

References

External links
Accelerated Learning Solutions website

Companies based in Florida